Suellen is a given name. Notable people with the name include:

Suellen Reed (born 1945), American educational politician
Suellen Rocca (born 1943), American artist